The Army School of Physical Training (ASPT) is the headquarters of the Royal Army Physical Training Corps (RAPTC) and the central training establishment for physical education, physical fitness and sports instructors in the British Army. It is located in Fox Lines, Aldershot, Hampshire, England.

References

External links
 Royal Army Physical Training Corps – on British Army official website
ASPT Pamphlet 16A

Military education and training in Hampshire
Military in Aldershot
Physical education in the United Kingdom
Sport in the British Army
Training establishments of the British Army